Silvanus planatus is a species of silvanid flat bark beetle in the family Silvanidae. It is found in North America and Oceania.

References

Further reading

 
 
 

Silvanidae
Beetles described in 1824